Lawrence Olum (born 10 July 1984) is a Kenyan professional footballer who plays as a defender and midfielder.

Career

College and amateur
Olum spent four years playing college soccer at Missouri Baptist University, earning NAIA honorable mention All-America honors three times.

After graduating, Olum spent the 2006 season with the St. Louis Lions of the USL Premier Development League, scoring 9 goals in 16 games.

Professional
Olum turned professional with the Portland Timbers of the USL First Division in 2007, before moving to the Minnesota Thunder in March 2009. He later played for the Austin Aztex and Orlando City, before moving to Sporting Kansas City of Major League Soccer in September 2011.

Olum moved to Kedah FA in the Malaysia Premier League ahead of the 2015 season. After one season abroad, he re-signed with Sporting Kansas City in December 2015.

On 3 February 2017, Olum was traded to Portland Timbers, now of MLS, in exchange for $50,000 in general allocation money and a first-round pick in the 2018 MLS SuperDraft. Olum was released by Portland on 10 December 2018.

On 15 March 2019, Olum was signed by Minnesota United FC.

On 16 January 2020, Olum was signed by Miami FC ahead of their first season in the USL Championship.

International career
Olum was the subject of interest from the Kenyan national team in November 2009. He was called up to the Kenya national team in November 2012 for the 2012 CECAFA Cup.

Olum made his international debut in a 1–0 victory over Comoros in May 2014.

References

External links
 
 

1984 births
Living people
Footballers from Nairobi
Kenyan footballers
Association football midfielders
Expatriate soccer players in the United States
Austin Aztex FC players
Kenyan expatriate footballers
Kenyan expatriates in the United States
Minnesota Thunder players
Orlando City SC (2010–2014) players
Portland Timbers players
Portland Timbers (2001–2010) players
Sporting Kansas City players
St. Louis Lions players
USL First Division players
USL League Two players
USSF Division 2 Professional League players
USL Championship players
Major League Soccer players
Kenya international footballers
Minnesota United FC players
Association football defenders
Miami FC players